USS Stephen W. Groves (FFG-29), twenty-first ship of the  of guided missile frigates, was named for Ensign Stephen W. Groves (1917–1942), a naval aviator who was posthumously awarded the Navy Cross for his heroism at the Battle of Midway during World War II.

Namesake
Stephen William Groves was born on 29 January 1917 in Millinocket, Maine. He graduated from Schenck High School in East Millinocket, Maine, and received a mechanical engineering degree from the University of Maine in 1939.

He joined the U.S. Navy in December 1940 and was commissioned in August 1941. He joined the aircraft carrier  in December 1941. The U.S. fighters were credited with shooting down 14 Japanese planes and causing six others to retreat.

Groves was declared missing and presumed dead on 5 June 1942. He was posthumously awarded the Navy Cross. The destroyer escort USS Groves (DE-543) was named for him, but its construction was cancelled in 1944. The American Legion Post in East Millinocket is named the Feeney-Groves Post, partially in his memory.

Construction and career
Ordered from Bath Iron Works, Bath, Maine, on 23 January 1978 as part of the FY78 program, Stephen W. Groves was laid down on 16 September 1980, launched on 4 April 1981, and commissioned on 17 April 1982, Commander Philip A. Bozzelli commanding.

Stephen W. Groves (FFG-29) is the first ship of that name in the U.S. Navy. A previous ship named for Ensign Groves, destroyer escort, was canceled in 1944 prior to completion. Assigned to Destroyer Squadron 14 and home-ported at Naval Station Mayport, Florida.

During her maiden voyage, Groves was assigned to units in support of US Marines stationed at the airport in Beirut, Lebanon. Additionally, Groves protected New Jersey and other surface units from air threats. She tracked unidentified submarines, monitored Yasser Arafat's transit from Beirut to Cyprus, and entered Beirut harbor with other units to conduct direct fire support against units hostile to USMC positions. Groves was awarded a Meritorious Unit Citation for these actions.

She was also on station when the frigate  was struck by two missiles from an Iraqi fighter jet, and assisted Stark in her return to Mayport, Florida.

In September 2003, while patrolling in the Eastern Pacific Stephen W. Groves captured a go-fast drug smuggling boat along with its six crewmembers. 1.5 tons of cocaine was recovered from the ocean after it had been dumped into the sea by the go-fast's crew.

On 28 August 2005, she sailed from her then-home port of Pascagoula, Mississippi, along with sister ship , under threat from Hurricane Katrina.

Deployed to the Indian Ocean, on 10 May 2011 she intercepted the Taiwanese longliner Jih Chun Tsai 68, which had been hijacked by Somalian pirates. Receiving fire from the fishing vessel, Stephen W. Groves engaged her in a single ship action that saw the pirate vessel sunk with three pirates killed, two wounded, and one Taiwanese hostage killed. Nineteen Somali pirates and two Chinese hostages were taken on board.  The rescued Chinese crew were repatriated to China and their families. She was decommissioned on 24 February 2012 and was moved to Brownsville, Texas for deconstruction and recycling to be completed in 2021.

References

External links 
 
 
 
  navysite.de: USS Stephen W. Groves
 MaritimeQuest USS Stephen W. Groves FFG-29 pages

 

1981 ships
Cold War frigates and destroyer escorts of the United States
Oliver Hazard Perry-class frigates of the United States Navy
Ships built in Bath, Maine